The 2011–12 UAE President's Cup is the 36th season of the UAE President's Cup, the premier knockout tournament for association football clubs in the United Arab Emirates.

The tournament was changed from previous editions and featured all 12 clubs from the Pro League, and the top four teams of the Federation Cup. The winners will qualify for the group stage of the 2013 AFC Champions League.

Round of 16
Round of 16 consisted of eight matches played on 17–18 December 2011. The winners of those matches advanced to Quarterfinals.

|colspan="4" style="background-color:#B8B8B8"|17 December 2011 

|-
|colspan="4" style="background-color:#B8B8B8"|18 December 2011 

|}

Quarter-finals

|colspan="4" style="background-color:#B8B8B8"|9 January 2011 

|-
|colspan="4" style="background-color:#B8B8B8"|10 January 2011 

|}

Semifinals
The matches will be played on 8 April 2012.

Final

References

UAE President's Cup seasons
Uae President's Cup